The Pitchfork Music Festival 2009 was held on July 17 to 19, 2009 at the Union Park, Chicago, United States.

In 2009, the festival initiated a program called Write the Night, which all of the performing bands on Friday night played sets consisting of songs voted for online by ticket-holders.

Lineup
Artists listed from latest to earliest set times.

References

External links

Pitchfork Music Festival
2009 music festivals